Edebé   Edebé is an educational and children's publisher located in Barcelona, founded in 1888 by a religious group. In the early 1990s, edebé embarked on a literary project and in 1993 edebé promoted the edebé literature award..

References 

Companies based in Barcelona
Publishing companies of Spain